East Ham North was a parliamentary constituency centred on the East Ham district of London, which was in Essex until 1965.  It returned one Member of Parliament (MP) to the House of Commons of the Parliament of the United Kingdom, elected by the first past the post voting system.

History 
The constituency was created by the Representation of the People Act 1918 for the 1918 general election.  It was abolished for the February 1974 general election.

Boundaries
1918–1950: The County Borough of East Ham wards of Manor Park, Plashet East, and Plashet West.

1950–1974: The County Borough of East Ham wards of Kensington, Little Ilford, Manor Park, Plashet, and Woodgrange.

Members of Parliament

Election results

Elections in the 1910s

Elections in the 1920s

Elections in the 1930s

Election in the 1940s

Elections in the 1950s

Elections in the 1960s

Election in the 1970s

References

Notes

Parliamentary constituencies in London (historic)
Constituencies of the Parliament of the United Kingdom established in 1918
Constituencies of the Parliament of the United Kingdom disestablished in 1974
Politics of the London Borough of Newham
History of the London Borough of Newham
East Ham